For the 2000 Vuelta a España, the field consisted of 179 riders; 124 finished the race.

By rider

By nationality

References

2000 Vuelta a España
2000